Anelasmocephalus hadzii is a species of trogulid, a group of opiliones, native to Europe.

Characteristic Features
A. hadzii has all legs except for the calcaneus are very hairy and warty. Soil particles, as with most trogulidae, are tightly glued to these warts. The glans of the penis is long and has a hook at the end. The distal end of this is long and thin.

References

Harvestmen
Animals described in 1978
Arachnids of Europe